The Dr. O'Callaghan Cup, officially known as the Cork Post-Primary Schools Senior A Hurling Championship, is an annual inter-schools hurling competition organised by the Cork Post-Primary Schools division of the Cork County Board of the Gaelic Athletic Association (GAA). It is the highest inter-schools hurling competition in the county of Cork.

The final, usually held in December, serves as the culmination of a series of games played between September and October. Eligible players must be under the age of 19.

Seven teams currently participate in the Dr. O'Callaghan Cup which is a single elimination tournament.

Christian Brothers College are the title-holders after defeating St. Colman's College by 2-22 to 2-16  in the 2018 final.

List of finals

References

External links
 Cork Post-Primary Schools GAA website

Hurling competitions in County Cork